Cyprinus dai is a species of ray-finned fish in the genus Cyprinus from the Black River basin in northern Vietnam.

References 

Cyprinus
Fish described in 1969